Cerinthe major, called honeywort along with other members of its genus, is a species of flowering plant in the genus Cerinthe, native to the Mediterranean region, and introduced to New Zealand. Gardeners have a choice along a spectrum of cultivars ranging from Cerinthe major subsp. major, with sea-green bracts and yellow flowers, to Cerinthe major subsp. purpurascens with blue bracts and purple flowers.

Subspecies
The following subspecies are currently accepted:

Cerinthe major subsp. major
Cerinthe major subsp. oranensis (Batt.) Selvi & L.Cecchi
Cerinthe major subsp. purpurascens (Boiss.) Selvi & L.Cecchi

Flowering
In Europe, it flowers between May and August.

References

Boraginoideae
Taxa named by Carl Linnaeus
Plants described in 1753
Flora of Malta